Eddie Brown (born October 2, 1969), nicknamed "Touchdown" Eddie Brown, is a former arena football offensive specialist who played for the Albany/Indiana Firebirds of the Arena Football League (AFL) from 1994 to 2003. He played college football at Louisiana Tech.

Professional career
Brown played for the Albany Firebirds from 1994 until 2001, and moved with the franchise to Indianapolis, Indiana where he played for three more seasons until 2003. In January 2006, as the AFL celebrated its 20th anniversary, Brown was voted the best player in league history. On August 12, 2011, Brown was named as an inductee into the AFL Hall of Fame.

Personal life
Brown is the father of NFL wide receiver Antonio Brown.

References

External links
 Just Sports Stats

1969 births
Living people
American football wide receivers
Af2 coaches
Albany Firebirds players
Indiana Firebirds players
Fort Scott Greyhounds football coaches
Louisiana Tech Bulldogs football players
Fort Scott Greyhounds football players
Wabash Little Giants football coaches
High school basketball coaches in New York (state)
High school football coaches in Florida
High school football coaches in Indiana
High school football coaches in Kansas
High school football coaches in New York (state)
Players of American football from Miami
Players of American football from Indianapolis
Sports coaches from Miami